Quarterly Journal of Political Science is a quarterly peer-reviewed academic journal which began in 2006. It is published by Now Publishers Inc. and focuses on positive political science and contemporary political economy. The journal's joint editors-in-chief are Scott Ashworth (University of Chicago) and Joshua D. Clinton (Vanderbilt University).

Abstracting and indexing 

According to the Journal Citation Reports, the journal has a 2015 impact factor of 1.645, ranking it 33rd out of 163 journals in the category "Political Science".

References

External links 
 

Quarterly journals
English-language journals
Political science journals
Publications established in 2006
Now Publishers academic journals